are a type of roof ornamentation found in Japanese architecture.  They are generally roof tiles or statues depicting a Japanese ogre (oni) or a fearsome beast.  Prior to the Heian period, similar ornaments with floral and plant designs (hanagawara) preceded the onigawara.  The present design is thought to have come from a previous architectural element, the oni-ita, which is a board painted with the face of an oni and was meant to stop roof leaks. During the Nara period the tile was decorated with other motifs, but later it acquired distinct ogre-like features and became strongly tridimensional. Onigawara are most often found on Buddhist temples. The tile's name notwithstanding, the ogre's face may be missing.

Images

See also

Chimera (architecture)
Gargoyle
Imperial roof decoration
Japanese architecture
Jisaburō Ozawa, an admiral nicknamed "Onigawara" by his men
Shachihoko
Shibi (roof tile)
Shisa

Notes

References

Parent, Mary Neighbour. (2003).  Japanese Architecture and Art Net Users System.

External links

Japanese architectural features
Oni
Roofs
Roof tiles
Architectural sculpture
Traditional East Asian Architecture